Qaleh Kandi (also Romanized as Qal’eh Kandī and Qal‘eh Kandī) is a village in Abish Ahmad Rural District, Abish Ahmad District, Kaleybar County, East Azerbaijan Province, Iran. At the 2006 census, its population was 817, with 193 families.

References 

Populated places in Kaleybar County